Burg Sterrenberg is the name of a number of castles:
 Burg Sterrenberg (Pfalz), Otterbach, Landkreis Kaiserslautern
 Burg Sterrenberg (Rhein), Kamp-Bornhofen, Rhein-Lahn